Siamés (stylized in all caps or as SIAMÉƧ) is an Argentinian electropop rock band established in 2013 by Guillermo "Stoltz" Stölzing as vocalist and guitarist and Juan Manuel "Blakk" Kokollo as keyboardist and synthesizer. Additional band members were included during the production of the band's album and after, with the members including Barbie Williams (vocalist), Gonzo Rooster (guitar), Tish Planes (vocalist), Lucas “Gato” Hernández (drums), Hutter Von Fonk (bass), and Walter C. (guitar).

History

2013-2019: Formation and Bounce Into The Music 
Stoltz and Blakk began working on music together in 2013, after meeting at a party at the Roxy club in Buenos Aires. The duo were playing at the venue for a party event called Roxtar, with Stoltz playing as a member of his former band MoodyMan, and Blakk acting as the programmer for other bands. The duo began making songs in English, despite their Spanish-speaking background. 

In 2015, the trio began taking their music "more seriously", around the same time that MoodyMan disbanded. They first put together the song "As You Get High" and then quickly produced ten more songs that were eventually compiled into the band's first album, Bounce Into The Music, that released in August of 2016. 

After playing in multiple concerts and as opening acts for bands such as The B-52's and The Magic Numbers, the two creators decided in 2015 to take a risk and develop "Argentina's first anime music video". They contracted a producer, Guillermo Porro, the Rudo Company as artists, and a director, Fernando Suniga, to make the video. The first single on the album, titled "The Wolf", was released alongside said animated music video for the song and which has since amassed over 140 million views on YouTube as of December 2021. They attribute the syncopation style mashup of the song with the video and the chorus to the style of French film director Michel Gondry.

2019-2020: "Summer Nights" & Home 
In June 2019, Siamés released "Summer Nights" featuring Barbie Williams, the first single and music video to promote their new upcoming album, Mother Robot. In November, the release of two more promotional singles, "No Lullaby" and "I Can't Wait", and the new album was re-titled Home. Two months later, Siamés released "Easier" and "Young & Restless". On March 13, 2020, Siamés released Home. The inspiration for Home was based around the idea that people want to fight for their dreams and be allowed to love the things they're interested in, while also combating the darkness in their life and their desire for hope.

Band members

Current members 

 Guillermo Stöltzing – vocals, songwriting, graphic art 
 Mr. Blakk – songwriting, production, piano 
 Gonzo Rooster – songwriting, bass guitar, guitar 
 Tish Planes – vocals 
 Walter C – guitar 
 Lucas "Gato" Hernandez – drums 
 Hutter Von Fonk – bass 
 Barbie Williams – vocals

Tours
The band held their first United States tour in January/February of 2020, with an additional stop in Mexico City.

Awards and honors
A music competition held in December of 2016 named True Sounds and hosted by Ballantine's was won by Siamés out of 270 independent bands.

References

Further reading

External links
 Official Website
 Official Youtube Channel

Musical groups established in 2013
Argentine rock music groups
Electropop groups